Portti (meaning Gateway in English) is a Finnish science fiction magazine published in Finland.

History and profile
Portti, published since 1982, is famous for its popular annual short story contest, held since 1986. The magazine is published by the Tampere Science Fiction Society. In the 1980s the publisher was the URSA Publishing House.

Its current editor is Raimo Nikkonen, and the magazine releases four issues per year.

See also
 Tähtivaeltaja, published by the Helsinki Science Fiction Club

References

External links
 Portti website

1982 establishments in Finland
Finnish-language magazines
Magazines published in Finland
Magazines established in 1982
Mass media in Tampere
Science fiction magazines
Science fiction magazines established in the 1980s
Quarterly magazines published in Finland